Tautvydas Strolia (born 31 March 1995) is a Lithuanian cross-country skier.

Strolia represented Lithuania at the FIS Nordic World Ski Championships 2021. He finished 84th in men's sprint, failed to qualify for individual 15 km race and was part of Lithuania's relay and sprint teams.

Strolia was selected to represent Lithuania at the 2022 Winter Olympics.

Family 
His father Vytautas Strolia is a former Lithuanian national champion in biathlon. His older brother Mantas Strolia represented Lithuania at the 2010 and 2018 Olympics.

References

Lithuanian male cross-country skiers
1995 births

Living people

People from Ignalina
Cross-country skiers at the 2022 Winter Olympics
Olympic cross-country skiers of Lithuania